The Communist Party of Puerto Rico (PCPR) is a communist party in Puerto Rico. The party was founded in 2010, after members reformed a previous organization called "".

It operates a political training school called "", that brings proletarian political education to schools, universities, and workers' councils. A similar effort, the "", was created online to reach an ever-growing group of people connected to the web and social networks. It also publishes , a weekly periodical that is directed to tackling the reality of Puerto Rico and class struggle.

References

External links 
 

2010 establishments in Puerto Rico
Anti-imperialist organizations
Communist parties in Puerto Rico
Political parties established in 2010
Political parties in Puerto Rico